GE Renewable Energy is an American wind turbine manufacturer  division of General Electric headquartered in Boulogne-Billancourt, Greater Paris, France focusing on production of energy from renewable sources. Its portfolio of products includes wind (onshore and offshore), hydroelectric and solar (concentrated and photovoltaic) power generating solutions. It is the world’s largest wind turbine manufacturer.

History
GE Renewable Energy was created in 2015, combining the wind power assets GE purchased from Alstom with those previously owned by GE and operated under the Power & Water division. Upon the division's creation, the headquarters of GE Renewable Energy moved from Schenectady, New York to Paris, France, part of conditions for the Alstom purchase.

Sub-Divisions

Wind

GE Wind Energy was formed out of the assets of Enron Wind purchased in 2002, and subsequently expanded with the purchase of ScanWind in 2009. GE Wind Energy expanded into offshore wind energy with the purchase of Alstom's energy generation assets (GE Offshore Wind, formerly Alstom Wind) in 2015.

GE Wind subsidiaries :

 GE Onshore Wind, headquartered in Schenectady, New York
 GE Offshore Wind, headquartered in Nantes, France
 GE Grid Solutions, headquartered in La Défense, France
 LM Wind Power, headquartered in Kolding, Denmark

Hydro
The GE Hydro sub-division of GE Renewable Energy is involved in hydroelectricity generation. This includes the design, manufacture, and installation of equipment for both gravity fed and pumped-storage power plants, and as upgrades to existing hydroelectric plants.

GE Hydro has developed aerating turbines designed to increase the amount of oxygen in water passing through the turbines, to benefit the aquatic life downstream.

GE Hydro's headquarters are in Boulogne-Billancourt, France.

Grid Solutions 
GE's Grid Solutions business encompasses the high-voltage power grid equipment and engineering activities of Alstom's former subsidiary, Alstom Grid, which itself was spun off from the transmission business of Areva T&D, a former subsidiary of the French multinational Areva.

GE Grid Solutions's headquarters are in Boulogne-Billancourt, France.

See also 
 General Electric
 GE Offshore Wind (former Alstom Wind)
 GE Wind Energy
 LM Wind Power
 Alstom

References

External links

General Electric subsidiaries